William Robert Mann (September 21, 1920 – January 20, 2006) was a mathematician from Chapel Hill, North Carolina. Mann worked in mathematical analysis. He was the discoverer and eponym of the Mann iteration, a dynamical system in a continuous function. He was one of Frantisek Wolf's students.

Publications 
William Robert Mann, Mean value methods in iteration, Proc. Amer. Math. Soc. 4, 1953, 506–510
William Robert Mann and Angus Ellis Taylor, Advanced Calculus, 3rd Edition, John Wiley and Sons, 1983

References

External links
Chapel Hill Memories, 

1920 births
2006 deaths
20th-century American mathematicians
21st-century American  mathematicians
Mathematical analysts